Massoud is a given name and a surname, commonly found in the Middle East and Asia. It has a variety of spellings including Masoud, Masud, Massoude, Massudeh, Masood, Masʽud, Masud, Mashud, Messaoud, Mesut, Mesud, or Mosād. People with the name Massoud include:

People with the given name Massoud 
 Massoud Abdelhafid, Libyan retired army general
 Massoud Achkar (1956–2021), Lebanese politician
 Massoud Amin (born 1961), American professor of engineering
 Massoud Behnoud, Iranian journalist
 Massoud Borazani, 1st president of Iraqi Kurdistan
 Massoud Fouladi, Iranian-born ophthalmologist
 Massoud Hamid, Kurdish Syrian photographer
 Massoud Hossaini (born 1981), Afghan-born photojournalist 
 Massoud Keshmiri, Iranian militant and undercover politician
 Massoud Khalili (born 1950), Afghan diplomat
 Massoud Pedram, Iranian American computer engineer
 Massoud Rajavi, Iranian militant politician
 Massoud Shafiee, Iranian lawyer

People with the surname Massoud 
 Ahmad Massoud (born 1989), Afghan leader
 Ahmad Shah Massoud (1953–2001), Afghan military leader 
 Ahmad Wali Massoud (born 1964), Afghan politician
 Ahmad Zia Massoud (born 1956), Afghan politician
 Donia Massoud (born 1979), Egyptian actress and singer
 Ghassan Massoud (born 1958), Syrian actor and filmmaker
 Mena Massoud (born 1991), Egyptian-born Canadian actor
 Moez Massoud, Egyptian scholar
 Shahir Massoud, Canadian chef and television personality

Persian given names
Persian-language surnames
Arabic-language surnames
Arabic masculine given names